Mobile Movie (aka "MobMov") is a worldwide network of guerrilla drive-ins using car-powered video projectors and FM transmitters. The MobMov represents over 150 independent guerrilla drive-ins, from United States to France, India, and Australia.

Shows are free and are announced via mailing list and SMS. Patrons drive to the listed location, tune their radios, and watch a movie drive-in style. The coordinator uses a car or small generator to power the projector and FM transmitter.

The MobMov was started by Bryan Kennedy in May, 2005. Kennedy's San Francisco-area MobMov has been defunct since late 2009 but other variations on the concept exist in the San Francisco Bay Area, and throughout the United States.

See also
 List of drive-in theaters
 Drive-in theater Revival, for other guerrilla drive in operations

References

External links
Official MobMov website
BBC: "Drive-in theaters refuse to fade away"
Time Magazine: "Movies that star the stars"
San Francisco Chronicle: "Reviving drive-in culture"
MobMov-Hollywood chapter

Cinemas and movie theaters
Drive-in theaters